Halaguru  or Halagur is a town in the southern state of Karnataka, India.

Location

Halaguru is situated at NH 948 (previously NH 209) and state highway KA SH 94. It is one of the oldest towns in Mandya district. It is 82 km from Bangalore the capital city of Karnataka, 60 km from Mysore, 50 km from Mandya, 41 km from Ramanagara, 10 km from Sathanur, 27 km from Kanakapura, 29 km from Channapatna and 90 km from Chamarajanagar

History
Halaguru had a history of seven great blacksmiths who had ruled the town.

Around 1000 people belong to the Vishwakarma community and they are living in the same street, Achar Street. Most of them are goldsmiths. This is the only place in Karnataka where Vishwakarma people found majority.

Geography

Halaguru is located in the Malavalli taluk of Mandya district in Karnataka. Main river is the Shimsa river one of the tribute of Kaveri. River Kaveri is located 15 km from the town at Bheemeshwari camp. It is one of the famous tourist attractions, and also near by other tourist places are Muthathi, Kokrebellur, Mekedaatu, Benki falls or Ganalu falls and Shivanasamudra Falls.

Demographics
As of the 2011 India census, Halaguru had a population of 10,176 comprising 5,107 males and 5,069 females giving a ratio of 993, higher than the Karnataka state average of 973.  There were 1,008 children aged 0-6 i.e. 9.91 % of the town's population. The literacy rate was 79.57 % (males 85.58 % and females 73.57 %. higher than the state average of 75.36 %.

Halaguru is administrated by a sarpanch (head of village) who is the village's elected representative.

Education

Halaguru has both private and government institutes, including:
 Govt degree college (B.A. and B.Com.) affiliated to University of Mysore
 Govt PU college
 Govt primary and High school
 Sapthagiri English school
 Halaguru High school
 JPM School
 JJ Public School 
 Good Shepherd School
 Divya Jyothi School
 Huwad School

References

External links
 http://Mandya.nic.in/

Villages in Mandya district